The Slough of Despond ( or ; "swamp of despair") is a fictional, deep bog in John Bunyan's allegory The Pilgrim's Progress, into which the protagonist Christian sinks under the weight of his sins and his sense of guilt for them.

It is described in the text:

The "Slough of Despond" may have been inspired by Squitch Fen, a wet and marshy area near his cottage in Harrowden, Bedfordshire, which Bunyan had to cross on his way to church in Elstow, or "The Souls' Slough" on the Great North Road between Tempsford and Biggleswade.

Allusions in other literature
This phrase has been referred to frequently in subsequent literature. Nathaniel Hawthorne's tale The Celestial Railroad is a satirical contrast between Bunyan's The Pilgrim's Progress and Hawthorne's perception of the current state of society. In Emily Brontë's Wuthering Heights the character Mr. Heathcliff likens his son's state of depression to having been dropped "into a Slough of Despond".  In George Gissing's New Grub Street, Milvain expresses concern for his friend Reardon's mental health, "His friends should exert themselves to raise him out of this fearful slough of despond".  In Horatio Hornblower: The Even Chance, by C. S. Forester, Midshipman Archie Kennedy describes Hornblower's new home as "His Majesty's ship of the line Justinian, known elsewise among her intimates as the good ship Slough of Despond."  In Mary McCarthy's novel The Group (1954), "Kay saw that [her husband, Harald] was sinking into a Slough of Despond (as they termed his sudden, Scandinavian fits of depression)".

W. Somerset Maugham alludes to the Slough in his book Of Human Bondage, where in a letter to the protagonist, Philip Carey, the failed poet Cronshaw details that he has "hopelessly immersed [himself ... in] the Slough of Despond," referring to his poverty. In Gerald Brom's novel, The Child Thief, The Slough is a passage of terror into the world Avalon, which Peter must travel through. In John Steinbeck's novel, Sweet Thursday (1954), Mack describes Doc's melancholic condition in suggesting that his fellow denizens of the Palace Flophouse help him out, using a punning conflation of slang and Bunyan: "Gentlemen [...] let us highly resolve to get Doc's ass out of the sling of despond" (79). In Harlan Ellison's short story "I Have No Mouth, and I Must Scream" (1967), the last five surviving humans are tortured by a godlike artificial intelligence named AM. The narrator relates how, among other harrowing experiences, "We passed through the Slough of Despond." In Louisa May Alcott's Hospital Sketches, a grateful Tribulation Periwinkle remarks that she feels "as did poor Christian [...] on the safe side of the Slough of Despond", and in her novel Jo's Boys, the titular character Jo's son Ted is said to be prone to "moods of gloom, and [falls] into the Slough of Despond about once a week". In Charles Portis's memoir Combinations of Jacksons (1999), he observes that his local dark marsh where he frolicked as a boy wasn't big enough or distinctive enough to have a proper name such as the Slough of Despond, sadly it was just "the slew".  In J. G. Farrell's Booker Prize winner, The Siege of Krishnapur (1973), the haunted Padre refers to a particularly dangerous crossing thus:

Allusions in placenames
 An area of wetlands in Canada located on the Bruce Trail near Big Bay, Ontario, north of Owen Sound is named after this fictional place.
 A quarry site near Symington in South Ayrshire has the Slough Burn flowing through it and on Ordnance Survey maps is marked as the Slough of Despond.

In other media
Mentioned in City and Colour's 2011 song "Northern Wind" from the album Little Hell:

I'm the darkest hourjust before the dawnI'm slowly sinkinginto the Slough of Despond

It is also mentioned in Cradle of Filth's 2010 song "Beyond Eleventh Hour", contained on the album Darkly, Darkly, Venus Aversa:

Part of the garden, her dark EdenFed Turkish Delights by poisoned frondsMy heart hardened in her wet seasonTreading mud in her slough of despond

Notes

References

External links

Bogs, fens and marshes in mythology
Christian allegory
John Bunyan
Fictional bodies of water